The Statute of Circumspecte Agatis (Latin: Statutū Circumspecte Agatis), or Circumspecte Agatis, was an English statute issued in 1285 by King Edward I. It defines the jurisdictions of Church and State, forcing church courts to confine themselves to ecclesiastical cases. This, along with the Articuli Cleri of Edward II, the Act of the 18th of Edward III (1344) and the Charter of Edward IV (1462), eventually settled this long-standing dispute.

See also benefit of clergy.

English law
1280s in law
1285 in England
13th century in England